Pseudomonas indica is a Gram-negative, butane-using bacterium first isolated in India. The type strain is MTCC 3713.

References

External links
Type strain of Pseudomonas indica at BacDive -  the Bacterial Diversity Metadatabase

Pseudomonadales
Bacteria described in 2002